Velammal Engineering College, is a private institution located in Chennai, India. Established in 1995, it was the first private engineering College to obtain an ISO 9001:2000 certificate.

History 

The Velammal Educational Trust is a registered non-minority service organization established in the year 1986 by  Thiru. M.V. Muthuramalingam.

Velammal Engineering College was established in the year 1995-96. It is a self-financing non-minority institution, affiliated to Anna University and approved by All India Council for Technical Education (AICTE) also ISO and Accreditation

Departments 

All programmes have been Accredited by the NBA.
 Computer Science & Engineering
 Electrical and Electronics Engineering
 Electronics and Communication Engineering
 Mechanical Engineering
 Information Technology
 Electronics and Instrumentation Engineering
 Civil Engineering
 Production Engineering
 Automobile Engineering

References

External links 

Engineering colleges in Chennai